is a Japanese manga written by Venio Tachibana and illustrated by Rihito Takarai. Seven Days was serialized in the quarterly  manga magazine Craft from 2007 to 2009. The story was released in two parts: Seven Days: Monday-Thursday and Seven Days: Friday-Sunday. A live-action film duology adaptation for both books was released in 2015.

Plot

Yuzuru Shino, a bored and disillusioned third-year high school student, hears a rumor that Tōji Seryō, a popular student at school, will accept anyone who asks him out at the beginning of the week and end their relationship after seven days of dating. Yuzuru decides to ask Tōji out as a half-hearted joke, but, to his surprise, Tōji accepts their date. Over the course of seven days, Yuzuru's feelings for him grow, and he begins to dread the impending day where they will inevitably end their relationship.

Characters

 (drama CD); portrayed by: Takeshi James Yamada (film)

 (drama CD); portrayed by: Tomoki Hirose (film)

Media

Manga

Seven Days is written by Venio Tachibana and illustrated by Rihito Takarai. It was serialized in the quarterly magazine anthology Craft from 2007 to 2009. The chapters were later released in bound volumes by Taiyoh Tosho under the Million Comics Craft Series imprint. The first volume was released under the title Seven Days: Monday-Thursday in 2007, while the second volume was released as Seven Days: Friday-Sunday in 2009. Drama CD adaptations of both books were released.

In October 2009, Digital Manga Publishing announced at Yaoi-Con that they were distributing the books in English under the Juné imprint. In March 2019, Viz Media took over English distribution rights and published both books as an omnibus titled Seven Days: Monday-Sunday under the SuBLime imprint.

Film

Two live-action film adaptations were announced in 2015, each adapting both books in the series. Both films are directed by Takeshi Yokoi, with screenplay by Natsuko Takahashi. The films star Tomoki Hirose and Takeshi James Yamada, with Hinako Tanaka, Yūki Hiyori, Rin Ishikawa, Itsuki Sagara, and Yukihiro Takiguchi in supporting roles. The first film, Seven Days: Monday-Thursday, premiered on June 6, 2015 in Humax Cinemas in Tokyo, followed by other theaters in Japan. The second film, Seven Days: Friday-Sunday, premiered on July 4, 2015.  Prior to the film's release, a behind-the-scenes DVD of Seven Days: Monday-Thursday was released on May 20, 2015, where it debuted at #73 on the Oricon DVD Weekly Charts. Pony Canyon released both movies as a set on DVD and Blu-ray on December 16, 2015. The DVD peaked at #48 on the Oricon DVD Weekly Charts, while the Blu-ray peaked at #59 on the Oricon Blu-ray Weekly Charts.

Reception

Seven Days was ranked #5 as one of the best boys love stories in Kono BL ga Yabai! 2010 Fujoshi Edition. In 2018, it was selected by visitors of the website Nijimen as one of the best boys' love manga for newcomers to the genre.

Seven Days was part of the inspiration behind the 2019 novel Date Me, Bryson Keller by South African author Kevin van Whye, who wrote the novel out of his critiques on Seven Days and the  genre in general with respect to "actual and realistic LGBT culture."

Notes

References

External links
 Official film adaptation website
 
 

Digital Manga Publishing titles
LGBT in anime and manga
Manga adapted into films
SuBLime manga
Viz Media manga
Yaoi anime and manga
2000s LGBT literature
Japanese LGBT-related films
Gay-related films
2015 films
2015 LGBT-related films
Japanese romantic drama films
LGBT-related romantic drama films